Virulent Rapture is the fifth studio album by British band Hecate Enthroned, and their first album of new material since 2004's Redimus. It was released on 25 November 2013 via Crank Music Group, being their first album to be so, as well as their only release with vocalist Elliot Beaver and first with drummer Gareth Hardy on the line-up, who replaced long-time vocalist and drummer Dean Seddon and Robert Kendrick, respectively (both were fired in 2012).

Background
The album was initially announced on a 21 January 2013 interview with webzine RoarRock.

The band announced on their official Twitter on 8 July 2013 that the new album was finished, "aside from some mixing and mastering issues", and that they were "looking at a self-release in the next few months". According to the band by then, the album was scheduled to be released on late November or early December 2013.

On 18 September 2013, Hecate announced they signed to a new label, Crank Music Group, and that it would release their album circa November.

On 23 October 2013, the artwork for Virulent Rapture was unveiled via Blabbermouth.net, and its release date was revealed as being on 25 November 2013. On the same day, a small, 21-second teaser of the track "Unchained" was posted by Crank Music Group on their official YouTube channel.

The track "To Wield the Hand of Perdition" was released online (via Crank Music Group's YouTube channel) on 19 November 2013.

Sarah Jezebel Deva, famous for her work with Angtoria and Cradle of Filth, provides additional vocals for the album's self-titled track.

On 20 June 2014, a music video was made for "Abyssal March". It is Hecate Enthroned's first music video since "An Ode for a Haunted Wood", made in 1995.

Track listing
The album's track listing was unveiled by Crank Music Group on their official website on 28 October 2013.

Personnel
Hecate Enthroned
Elliot Beaver — vocals
Nigel Dennen — guitar
Andy Milnes — guitar
Dylan Hughes — bass guitar
Pete White — keyboards
Gareth Hardy — drums

Guest musicians
 Sarah Jezebel Deva — additional vocals on "Virulent Rapture"

Miscellaneous staff
 Mike Smith — production, engineering, mixing
 Kami Kopat — mixing, mastering, graphic layout
 Néstor Avalos — cover art

References 

2013 albums
Hecate Enthroned albums